Lehra Sondha is a small village situated on the NH7 in Bathinda district of Punjab, India. The post office of the village is Lehra Dhurkot and the Tehsil is Nathana. This village is near the Guru Hargobind Thermal Plant.
The village's population is approximately 2400, and 1300 people have right of vote.

Economy
The main occupation of village is farming, but approximately 100+ people have government jobs. The main share of villagers are also working in the thermal plant.

Government
Harmail Singh is Sarpanch of the village and he has 7 members for help. This village is in the block of Bhucho M.L.A seat and Bathinda M.P. seat.

Culture
People are connected with Punjabi culture.

Religion
People are from the Sikh religion, so that's why there are two Gurudwara Sahib and 1 smad of sant kartar Das ji.
All castes are sub castes of the Sikh religion like Jatts, Harijans, Ramdasia, and Mehre Sikhs...apart from this Mistri and Raja Sikh.

Education
Village is average educated because there is not High School, but just Middle Government School. Children and youngsters have to go city Bathinda for better education.

Other facilities
There is one Sub Health Centre and Mnrega Centre also.water box supply is too good but not playground for young guys.

Villages in Bathinda district